Requiem for Mrs. J. is a 2017 Serbian drama and comedy film directed by Bojan Vuletić. It was screened in the Panorama section at the 67th Berlin International Film Festival. It was selected as the Serbian entry for the Best Foreign Language Film at the 90th Academy Awards, but it was not nominated.

Plot
A widow plans to kill herself on the anniversary of her husband's death, but first seeks to tie up some absurd loose ends.

Cast
 Mirjana Karanović as Gospodja J
 Jovana Gavrilović as Ana
 Danica Nedeljković as Koviljka
 Vučić Perović as Milance
 Mira Banjac as Desanka

See also
 List of submissions to the 90th Academy Awards for Best Foreign Language Film
 List of Serbian submissions for the Academy Award for Best Foreign Language Film

References

External links
 

2017 films
2017 comedy films
Serbian comedy films
2010s Serbian-language films
Films set in Serbia